Michael Pickens (born 7 January 1983) is a racecar driver from Auckland, New Zealand. He races midgets and sprint cars in New Zealand, Australia and the United States. Michael is the 9 time New Zealand Midget Car champion and was the 2021 Speedcar champion. He was also the 2016 Australian Speedcar Champion. He has won races and championships in New Zealand, Australia, and United States in Quarter Midgets, 3/4 Midgets, Midgets, Sprint Cars and Karts.

Racing career
In 2005, Pickens competed at the Chili Bowl midget car race at Tulsa, Oklahoma. He won Rookie of the Year honors with an outstanding drive from 19th starting position to a race ending 6th-place finish. He was noticed by some key people at NASCAR NEXTEL Cup's Roush Racing. While not having prior experience on pavement, as there are no pavement ovals in New Zealand, Pickens did compete in the Roush's Driver Development Competition Program in 2005. He made it to the final round of competition and was the last driver be cut.

In 2005, Pickens won the 55th running of the Australian Speedcar Grand Prix held at the Avalon Raceway in Victoria. That year he also finished second in the Australian Speedcar Championship at the Perth Motorplex. He would later finish 3rd in the 2011 Australian Championship in Lismore, New South Wales. In 2016 Michael won the Australian Speedcar title at Paramatta Raceway.

Michael's regular rides in New Zealand are his own #1NZ Midget and the Pipeline Industries #3NZ Sprint car. Michael's regular Australian drive is with Brett Morris, competing in the Australian Speedcar Championship and the World Midget Series. Michael also drives in the USA, competing at Midget Week, the Turkey Night Grand Prix and Chili Bowl Nationals.

In the middle of the 2007 U.S. season, he raced for Ken Hendricks' American Speed Association Late Model Team, Urban Force Racing, mainly at Madison International Speedway. He left the team in July (being replaced by Dan Lensing) near the middle of the season, and began running a mixture of midget and pavement car races for various owners.

In the 2008 U.S. racing season, he raced a midget car weekly at Angell Park Speedway and the #30 car in ASA Late Model Series events.

Career Highlights

2016 Australian Speedcar Champion (and first ever New Zealander to win this title)

2015/16 International Midget Series Overall Winner (and winner of World 30 Lap Derby and 50 Lap Classic)

9 times New Zealand Midget Champion

1 time New Zealand Sprint Car Champion

Multiple winged sprint car feature wins

Multiple track and lap records

Multiple National Series Championship wins

Multiple A-main wins including 9 consecutive A-main wins in a row

5 times New Zealand midget Grand Prix win

2 times North Island champion

5 times Barry Butterworth 40 lap winner

Multiple International Series wins over 30, 40 and 50 laps

Multiple seasons as International Test Team Captain

Multiple Herman Tros shield wins

Multiple USAC/POWRi/Badger feature wins

6 times Chili Bowl A-main qualifier

3rd 2011 Chili Bowl A-main

UMRA TQ feature winner (on debut)

2 times Australian Super Series speedcar Championship winner (midgets)

Australian Grand Prix winner (midgets)

ASA Pavement Late Model Series feature and pole winner

NASCAR Craftsman Truck Driver X finalist

References

External links

Official website

1983 births
Living people
New Zealand racing drivers
New Zealand speedway (auto racing) drivers
Sportspeople from the Auckland Region
Toyota Racing Series drivers